Nubatukan is a district located in Lembata Regency, East Nusa Tenggara province of Indonesia. In this district is located Lewoleba which is the capital of Lembata Regency.

Demographics
Nubatukan district has a population that is mostly ethnic Flores. In 2021, the population of Nubatukan was 41,379 with a population density of 287/km². Most of the population is Christianity 77.80%, of which Catholicism 73.43% and Protestantism 4.37% while most of the others are Islam which is 22.05%, and a small proportion are Hinduism 0.14% and Buddhism 0.01%.

References

Populated places in East Nusa Tenggara
Solor Archipelago
Lembata Regency